James Swan (born 6 July 1974 in Alice Springs, Northern Territory) is an indigenous bantamweight boxer from Australia, who represented his native country at 1996 and 2000 Summer Olympics.

Swan won bronze medals at 1994 and 1998 Commonwealth Games.

He was an Australian Institute of Sport scholarship holder.

References

External links
 AOC Profile 
 
 
 
 
 

1974 births
Living people
Australian male boxers
Olympic boxers of Australia
Boxers at the 1996 Summer Olympics
Boxers at the 2000 Summer Olympics
Commonwealth Games bronze medallists for Australia
Commonwealth Games medallists in boxing
Boxers at the 1994 Commonwealth Games
Boxers at the 1998 Commonwealth Games
People from Alice Springs
Sportsmen from the Northern Territory
Australian Institute of Sport boxers
Indigenous Australian Olympians
Bantamweight boxers
Medallists at the 1994 Commonwealth Games
Medallists at the 1998 Commonwealth Games